Paracossus is a genus of moths in the family Cossidae.

Species
 Paracossus furcatus Hampson, 1904
 Paracossus griseatus Yakovlev, 2009
 Paracossus hainanicus Yakovlev, 2009
 Paracossus indradit Yakovlev, 2009
 Paracossus longispinalis (I. Chou & B.Z. Hua, 1988)
 Paracossus parvus Hampson, 1905
 Paracossus zyaung Yakovlev, 2014

Former species
 Paracossus acronyctoides (Moore, 1879)
 Paracossus amasonca Yakovlev, 2006
 Paracossus artushka Yakovlev, 2006
 Paracossus celebensis 
 Paracossus chloratus (Swinhoe, 1892)
 Paracossus cinereus (Roepke, 1957)
 Paracossus javanus 
 Paracossus khmer Yakovlev, 2004
 Paracossus loeffleri 
 Paracossus microgenitalis Yakovlev, 2004
 Paracossus pinratanai Yakovlev, 2004
 Paracossus pusillus (Roepke, 1957)
 Paracossus rama Yakovlev, 2006
 Paracossus retak (Holloway, 1986)
 Paracossus rufidorsia (Hampson, 1905)
 Paracossus schoorli Yakovlev, 2004
 Paracossus seria (Holloway, 1986)
 Paracossus speideli (Holloway, 1986)
 Paracossus subfuscus 
 Paracossus telisai (Holloway, 1986)
 Paracossus thaika Yakovlev, 2006
 Paracossus xishuangbannaensis (Chou et Hua, 1986)

References

 , 1990: A Phylogenetic study on Cossidae (Lepidoptera: Ditrysia) based on external adult morphology. Zoologische Verhandelingen 263: 1-295. Full article: .
 , 2004: New taxa of Cossidae from SE Asia. Atalanta 35(3-4): 369-382.
 , 2004: Cossidae of Thailand. Part 2. (Lepidoptera: Cossidae). Atalanta 35 (3-4): 383-389.
 , 2006, New Cossidae (Lepidoptera) from Asia, Africa and Macronesia, Tinea 19 (3): 188-213.
 , 2009: New taxa of African and Asian Cossidae (Lepidoptera). Euroasian Entomological Journal 8 (3): 353-361. Full article: .

External links
Natural History Museum Lepidoptera generic names catalog

Cossinae